The Cavalier Hotel is a historic hotel building at 4200 Atlantic Avenue in Virginia Beach, Virginia.  The seven-story building was designed by Neff and Thompson with a Y-shaped floor plan and was completed in 1927.  Most of its hotel rooms featured views of the Atlantic Ocean, and all had private bathrooms.  The hotel also featured dining facilities and opportunities for shopping, as well as amenities such as swimming pools that are now common features of modern hotels.

Entertainment, sports figures, and other celebrities who stayed at the Cavalier included F. Scott Fitzgerald, Zelda Fitzgerald, Bob Hope, Elizabeth Taylor, Judy Garland, Doris Day, Bette Davis, Muhammad Ali, President Harry Truman,  and President Jimmy Carter. Other U.S. Presidents staying overnight at the Cavalier included Herbert Hoover, Dwight Eisenhower, John F. Kennedy, and Lyndon Johnson. 

On Memorial Day weekend in 1929, shortly before the stock market crash, the famed Cavalier Beach Club opened on the oceanfront at the bottom of the Cavalier Hotel and drew big dance bands such as Benny Goodman, Cab Calloway, Glenn Miller, and Lawrence Welk, and other performers, including Frank Sinatra and Ella Fitzgerald.

The hotel was built during the period of prosperity known as the Roaring Twenties, and was a major element of the development of Virginia Beach as a resort area.  The hotel was operated successfully until 1942, when it was commandeered by the United States Navy as a training center during World War II.  It was returned to its owners in 1945, but the lost years hurt the business.  The property was used as a private club for a time in the 1950s and 1960s, and eventually reopened as a hotel. The hotel was listed on the National Register of Historic Places in 2014.

The hotel property was sold in 2013 under court order and the new owners began an extensive renovation and restoration of the structure with an anticipated opening of summer 2016. Due to  unanticipated repairs, the owners announced in April 2016 that the opening would be delayed until 2017. The additional demolition and work added $24 million to the original $50 million estimate. Work completed in late 2017 and the facility opened in spring 2018 with 62 rooms and 23 suites, down from the original 135. The hotel also retained 21 of its original .

On what had been vacant land north of the hotel, the owners constructed a housing development. In 2015, they demolished the Cavalier Oceanfront Hotel, across Atlantic Avenue, and began constructing a new hotel, scheduled to open in 2020. They also have plans for a third hotel in the complex.

The Cavalier Hotel officially opened Wednesday, March 7, 2018, with a "Grand Reveal" event at the historic property. The Virginian-Pilot reported that "About 100 people gathered at dusk on the brick pathway as lights illuminating the hotel were switched on. After four years of restoration work that cost $81 million, the “Grande Dame” is back."

On top of the $85 million added in renovations, the Cavalier hotel also attracts tourists for its haunted historical value as well. The Cavalier gained this haunted reputation in the early 1920s as founder of Coors Beer, Adolph Coors, was found dead as he jumped off the sixth floor of the hotel. Since then, there have been Hotel guest reports about chilling voices, cats hissing, and even ghosts walking down the sixth floor hallway.

Gallery

See also
 List of Historic Hotels of America
National Register of Historic Places listings in Virginia Beach, Virginia

References

Hotel buildings on the National Register of Historic Places in Virginia
Renaissance Revival architecture in Virginia
Hotel buildings completed in 1927
Buildings and structures in Virginia Beach, Virginia
National Register of Historic Places in Virginia Beach, Virginia